J. J. Newberry's was an American five and dime store chain in the 20th century. It was founded in Stroudsburg, Pennsylvania, United States, in 1911 by John Josiah Newberry (1877–1954). J. J. Newberry learned the variety store business by working in stores for 17 years between 1894 and 1911. There were seven stores in the chain by 1918.

John Josiah Newberry
John Josiah Newberry (September 26, 1877 – March 6, 1954) was born in Sunbury, Pennsylvania, Newberry first worked in the railroad business before joining retail store Fowler, Dick and Walker in 1894. In 1899 he joined S. H. Kress & Co. where he stayed until 1911.

He founded the J. J. Newberry chain of five and dime stores in Stroudsburg, Pennsylvania, in 1911. The first store was a success, and he opened a branch in Freeland, Pennsylvania in 1912. After 1919 he managed the company with his brothers Edgar A. Newberry and C.T. Newberry. At the time of Newberry's death (1954), the J.J. Newberry chain had 475 stores.

J. J. Newberry Company
The company was a family business. J. J. Newberry was joined in management by his brothers C.T. Newberry and Edgar A. Newberry in 1919, at which time there were 17 stores with yearly sales of $500,000.

Over the years, the Newberry chain acquired other stores including Hested  in Wyoming, Missouri, Ohio, North Dakota, Colorado, and Nebraska, and Lee Stores in South Dakota, Minnesota, Maine, and Iowa. At the time of founder J.J. Newberry's death (1954), the chain had 475 stores. By 1961, the company operated 565 stores with total yearly sales of $291 million. The chain also operated a larger department store called Britt's Department Store.

McCrory Stores purchased the 439 unit J. J. Newberry Co. in 1972.  McCrory Stores continued to operate it under the Newberry banner as a separate division.  McCrory opened additional stores under the Newberry banner especially in the Northeast and California where the name had a strong presence. The company thrived throughout the 1980s but fell on hard times in the early 1990s. The demise of the company became evident following a Chapter 11 bankruptcy filing in 1992. In 1997, McCrory closed 300 stores including many in the Newberry's division, however several others remained. In the year 2000, most remaining Newberry's and other McCrory-branded five and dime stores had been converted to the Dollar Zone brand, as McCrory's attempted to radically change its business model. The remaining Newberry stores closed along with the whole McCrory's chain in February 2002.

Early J. J. Newberry stores featured a recognizable logo composed of gold or white sans serif letters on a red background that usually occupied the entire width of the store facade. This was similar to the early signage of competitors Woolworth's, Neisner Brothers and the S. S. Kresge. Later stores featured a cursive 1960s modern logo style, dropping the "J. J." altogether.

Poet Donald Hall wrote a poem, Beans and Franks, about the closing of a J.J. Newberry store in Franklin, New Hampshire.

Britt's
Britt's was a division of J. J. Newberry. Founded in the Pacific Northwest in the early 1900s, the J. J. Newberry chain acquired it in December 1928 and all Britts stores were rebranded as J.J. Newberry locations. Newberry revived the Britts name in the early 1960s as a discount store division. During the Birmingham civil rights campaign, activists organized sit-ins at the segregated lunch counters in Britt's Department Stores, which led to the arrest of 20 protesters.

References

Sources
 
 
 .

External links 
 Biography of J.J. Newberry 

American companies established in 1911
Five and dimes
Defunct discount stores of the United States
Companies based in Monroe County, Pennsylvania
McCrory Stores
Retail companies established in 1911
Companies that filed for Chapter 11 bankruptcy in 1992
Companies with year of disestablishment missing